Franz Schuster (26 December 1892 – 24 July 1972) was an Austrian architect. His work was part of the architecture event in the art competition at the 1936 Summer Olympics.

References

1892 births
1972 deaths
20th-century Austrian architects
Olympic competitors in art competitions
Architects from Vienna